Domino Printing Sciences PLC is a British-based developer of Industrial and Commercial inkjet printing, thermal transfer printing, print and apply machines, digital printing presses and laser printing products. At present, they are operating in over 120 countries and employ over 2,800 employees and have manufacturing facilities in the UK, US, China, Germany, India, Sweden and Switzerland. The company's roots are in the industrial printer hardware space, until recently, when they have begun to move into the software space.

History
The company was founded by Graeme Minto in 1978 to exploit continuous inkjet technology (CIJ). By 1984 Domino had shipped its 1000th printer. It was first listed as DNO on the London Stock Exchange in 1985. In 1989 Domino moved to a new headquarters, located a few miles from Cambridge. Then in 1994 it acquired Directed Energy, a small laser marking business based in California, United States. In 2004 it acquired Wiedenbach, a supplier of ink jet printers, and Purex, a supplier of fume extractors for laser printers. In 2005, it acquired Sator, a supplier of laser printers. In 2006 it acquired Enterprise Information Systems, an RFID specialist. In March 2015 Japan's Brother Industries announced it planned to buy Domino Printing Sciences PLC for £1.03 billion in cash ($1.55 billion). On 12 June 2015 Brother Industries announced it had formally completed the acquisition of Domino Printing Sciences plc.

After 22 years of success at technology manufacturer Domino Printing Sciences – including managing the sale of the FTSE250 company to Brother Industries in 2015 – CEO Nigel Bond, 61, has passed on the management baton following his retirement at the end of March 2019. Robert Pulford, previously managing director of Domino’s Digital Printing Solutions Division, was appointed by the company to take over the CEO role.

Products and technologies 
Products produced by the company include Continuous Inkjet (Small Character) systems, Digital Colour Label Presses, Piezo Micro Drop on Demand (Piezo DOD) systems, Scribing Laser Coding and Marking systems, High Speed Binary Inkjets, Valve Jet Drop on Demand (Large Character) systems, Print And Apply Label Applicator Systems (PALM), Thermal Inkjet (TIJ) systems, Thermal Transfer – packaging printing systems and Fume Extraction systems.

Software 
Software products produced by the company show a large push toward the Industry 4.0 space to control multiple printing and coding machines simultaneously. Some of the company's software offerings include Inkjet and Production line Controllers and Coding Automation software.

Operations
The company has operations organised as follows:
 Domino Lasers –  (Germany)
 Wiedenbach Apparatebau GmbH –  (Germany)
 Graph-Tech AG – Switzerland
 Domino Print and Apply (Mectec Elektronik AB until 2016) – Sweden
 PostJet Systems Ltd – UK
 Domino Printing - México

References

Manufacturing companies established in 1978
Companies based in Cambridge
Manufacturing companies of England
Companies formerly listed on the London Stock Exchange
1978 establishments in England